Verkhniye Postoyalye Dvory is a rural locality in Plotavsky Selsoviet Rural Settlement, Oktyabrsky District, Kursk Oblast, Russia. Population:

Geography 
The village is located 59 km from the Russia–Ukraine border, 29 km south-west of Kursk, 14 km south-west of the district center – the urban-type settlement Pryamitsyno, 6 km from the selsoviet center – Plotava.

 Climate
Verkhniye Postoyalye Dvory has a warm-summer humid continental climate (Dfb in the Köppen climate classification).

Transport 
Verkhniye Postoyalye Dvory is located 15.5 km from the federal route  Crimea Highway (a part of the European route ), on the road of regional importance  (Dyakonovo – Sudzha – border with Ukraine), 10.5 km from the nearest railway halt 439 km (railway line Lgov I — Kursk).

The rural locality is situated 39 km from Kursk Vostochny Airport, 111 km from Belgorod International Airport and 237 km from Voronezh Peter the Great Airport.

References

Notes

Sources

Rural localities in Oktyabrsky District, Kursk Oblast